"Delicate" is a song by American singer-songwriter Taylor Swift, appearing on her sixth studio album, Reputation (2017). It was written by Swift and its producers, Max Martin and Shellback. Swift described "Delicate" as one of the songs about vulnerability on Reputation, contrary to the album's recurring themes of vengeance and feigned disinterest in her perceived image. The lyrics are about her insecurity in whether her new love interest would be bothered by her blemished reputation. To create a sound accompanying the vulnerable sentiment, Martin and Shellback manipulated Swift's vocals with a vocoder. "Delicate" is an electropop ballad with dense synthesizers and tropical house beats.

The song's music video, directed by Joseph Kahn and filmed in Los Angeles, premiered on March 11, 2018, at the 2018 iHeartRadio Music Awards. In the video, after becoming invisible upon receiving a mysterious note, Swift dances barefoot through public places, and ultimately becomes visible again after dancing in a pouring rain. Critics interpreted the video as Swift's autobiographical reference to her personal life, as she had retreated herself from the press while promoting Reputation. A day following the video's release, "Delicate" was released to US radio stations by Big Machine and Republic Records, as the fourth mainstream radio single from the album.

"Delicate" received widespread acclaim from music critics, who praised Swift's songwriting and the song's mellower production compared to the album's overarching brash sound. It featured in 2018 year-end lists by Billboard, Slant Magazine, and Rolling Stone. A sleeper hit in the United States, "Delicate" peaked at number 12 on the Billboard Hot 100 and topped Billboard airplay charts: Mainstream Top 40, Adult Contemporary, and Adult Pop Songs. It was certified double platinum by the Recording Industry Association of America (RIAA). The single peaked within the top 40 of singles charts in Australia, Canada, the Czech Republic, Greece, Hungary, Iceland, Ireland, Malaysia, New Zealand, and Norway, and received platinum certifications in Australia and Brazil.

Background 
American singer-songwriter Taylor Swift released her fifth studio album, 1989, in October 2014. 1989 synth-pop production transformed Swift's sound and image from country-oriented to mainstream pop. The album was a commercial success, selling over five million copies in the US within one year, and spawning three Billboard Hot 100 number-one singles. The BBC asserted that the success solidified Swift's status as a global pop star.

Swift was a target of tabloid gossip during the promotion of 1989. Her "America's Sweetheart" reputation, a result of her wholesome and innocent image, was blemished from publicized short-lived relationships and disputes with other celebrities, including a dispute with rapper Kanye West and media personality Kim Kardashian. Swift became increasingly reticent on social media, having previously maintained an active presence with a large following, and avoided interactions with the press amidst the tumultuous affairs. She conceived her sixth studio album, Reputation, as an answer to the media commotion surrounding her celebrity.

Production and composition

 
Swift wrote "Delicate" with its producers, Max Martin and Shellback. It was engineered by Sam Holland and Michael Ilbert at MXM Studios in Stockholm, Sweden, and Los Angeles, California. The song was mixed by Şerban Ghenea at MixStar Studios in Virginia Beach, Virginia, and mastered by Randy Merrill at Sterling Sound Studios in New York.

Lyrically, Swift conceived "Delicate" as a confession to a prospective lover and described the song—the fifth track on Reputation—as the album's "first point of vulnerability". The preceding four tracks are about Swift's flippant disinterest in her perceived reputation, which is the recurring theme throughout the album. On "Delicate", she begins to reveal her inner vulnerability. During an album release party with iHeartRadio, Swift explained the meaning behind the song: while she could feign disinterest in others' opinions about her, things became complicated "when you meet somebody that you really want in your life", which prompted her to wonder, "Could something fake like your reputation affect something real, like someone getting to know you?" To create a sound that reflects the lyrics' vulnerable sentiment, Martin and Shellback manipulated Swift's vocals with a vocoder, which Swift thought sounded "really emotional, vulnerable, and ... sad but beautiful". This vocoder effect is recurring on subsequent tracks of Reputation.

"Delicate" is an electropop ballad. The song incorporates dense synthesizers and tropical house-influenced beats. At the beginning of the song, Swift confesses to her love interest that, because her reputation has "never been worse", "you must like me for me". Critic Carl Wilson from Slate interpreted this part as Swift's revelation on her public image: after the media gossip, she achieved a "liberation" that allowed her to "make her private life her own at last". She shares intimate moments with her love interest at a dive bar "on the East Side". Throughout the song, Swift goes through her inner monolog about whether what she does would affect this blossoming romance and how much her feelings would be reciprocated, over a muted pulse: "Is it cool that I said all that? Is it too soon to do this yet? 'Cause I know that it's delicate." Though she feigns confidence and tries to control her inner self-awareness, she admits: "I pretend you're mine all the damn time." In the refrain, a high-pitched voice echoes the title "Delicate" back to Swift's lyrics.

Release
The music video of "Delicate" premiered at the 2018 iHeartRadio Music Awards on March 11. Following the video's premiere, Big Machine and Republic Records released the song to US hot adult contemporary radio stations on March 12, and US contemporary hit radio on March 13, as Reputation fourth pop radio single. Swift released another music video for the song—shot in a vertical format—exclusively on Spotify for users in the US, the United Kingdom, Sweden, and Latin America, on March 30, 2018. It was available on YouTube for audiences worldwide on May 15. In Europe, "Delicate" was available for digital download in Germany on March 12, and to Italian and UK radio stations on April 20, 2018.

As part of the Spotify Singles series, Swift recorded a stripped-down version of "Delicate" using acoustic guitars in place of the original version's synthesizers. The version was released alongside Swift's cover of Earth, Wind & Fire's "September" as a two-track extended play (EP) on April 13, 2018, by Spotify. Two official remixes supported "Delicate": one by Sawyr and Ryan Tedder, available on May 25, and the other by Seeb, available on June 8, 2018.

Music video

Synopsis

Directed by Joseph Kahn, the music video was shot over two nights in Los Angeles; landmarks featured include the Millennium Biltmore Hotel, the 7th Street/Metro Center station, the Los Angeles Theater, and the Golden Gopher bar. The video opens with Swift on the red carpet, seeming disconnected from the crowd gazing off in the distance. She snaps back to reality as a reporter points a microphone at her face for an interview. Amidst camera lights, a mysterious figure slips a sparkling paper note into her hand.

After the red-carpet interviews, Swift walks into a hotel lobby surrounded by four bodyguards as the guests turn around and look at her. Swift is bothered by the attention toward her, and when she gets some privacy in a dressing room, she turns the note over in her hand and makes silly faces in the mirror before being interrupted by a group of women. When she turns back to the mirror, the note sparkles and she realizes she has become invisible as her reflection in the mirror disappears.

Thrilled by her newfound freedom from fame, Swift starts dancing barefoot through the hotel. Though she seems elated by her invisibility, there are poignant moments—at one scene in an elevator with another woman, Swift thinks that woman is smiling at her, but she is in fact looking at her own reflection in the mirror. Swift continues dancing through a subway platform, and dances in a pouring rain before arriving at a dive bar. As she holds the note, everyone in the bar turns and looks at her, and she is visible again, smiling.

Analysis and reception
Media outlets considered the video's depiction of Swift's invisibility from the crowd an autobiographical reference, given that she had not given press interviews while promoting Reputation. Writing for The Washington Post, Emily Yahr described the video as a representation of Swift's celebrity. Yahr explained that the scenes where Swift appears jaded from the reporters and bodyguards were parallel to Swift's retreat from the press, and called her invisibility a metaphor for "the only time she's able to be herself". Denise Warner from Billboard wrote that the video's depiction of Swift being "clearly disturbed by her fame" resembled the narrative of Britney Spears's 2000 video "Lucky". In another analysis for Billboard, Richard He wrote: "Swift's a singer and guitarist by trade, but through her dancing and facial expressions, she's learned to tell stories with her whole body." According to He, while the lyrics to "Delicate" were inspired by Swift's love life, the video was inspired by her relationship with her audience. He observed that her cathartic, honest, and rather awkward dancing "for the pure joy of music" reminded her audience of "the reason she began writing songs in the first place". The video won Best Music Video at the 2019 iHeartRadio Music Awards.

Upon the video's release, some commentators on the internet accused "Delicate" of plagiarizing an advertisement directed by Spike Jonze in 2016 for "Kenzo World", a fragrance by the French brand Kenzo. As noted by Emma Payne—a scholar in music and cinema in the digital era—both visuals depict a woman who "breaks free from the pressures of society and acts freely as though nobody is watching"; to express this sentiment, both feature a choreography made up of unconventional dance moves, such as "marching and stomping" and "animalistic squatting", intertwined with conventional ballet moves. Payne commented that in doing so, the video allows the audience to see the "real" Swift beyond her commercially marketed image. She noted, nonetheless, due to the plagiarism controversy, Swift's persona was scrutinized for being "insincere or fake", a claim that had perpetuated since her earlier "dorky" image.

Critical reception
"Delicate" received widespread acclaim from music critics, most of whom commended Swift's songwriting. Roisin O'Connor of The Independent described the song as an example of Swift's "most honest and direct songwriting". AllMusic's Stephen Thomas Erlewine similarly praised Swift's portrayal of vulnerability as "a necessary exercise" for her to mature as a singer-songwriter. Ann Powers writing for NPR called "Delicate" one of Reputation "most memorable tracks", and described it as a reminder of Swift's songwriting talents in creating personal and relatable songs about her generation's "fashion choices, modes of gossip, dating habits and dreams of a comfortable middle-class life". To explain this viewpoint, Powers highlighted the lyrics mentioning Swift's love interest in Nike shoes: "In 21st-century America, 'Nikes' is as evocative a word as 'heartache' or 'promise.' Swift understands the heart that beats beneath the brand name."

Other critics highlighted the song's mellower production and vulnerable sentiment, in contrast to Reputation heavy electronic production and themes about drama and vengeance. Zach Schonfeld of Newsweek complimented "Delicate" for offering a heartfelt atmosphere in contrast with "the bravado and EDM aggression of the opening tracks". In a similar vein, Troy Smith from The Plain Dealer called it one of the album's better songs because "Swift keeps the mood light". For Sal Cinquemani from Slant Magazine, the song's blending "scathing self-critique with effervescent pop" offers an enjoyable moment that contrasts with the album's dominant "tired, repetitive EDM tricks". Clash editor Shahzaib Hussain criticized Reputation as a pretentious album with excessive lyrics about fame, but praised "Delicate" as one of the tracks that offer emotional honesty. On a less enthusiastic side, Spin Jordan Sargent wrote that even though the song is one of Reputation most honest, it is still "unshackled" from the album's recurring themes of drama and vengeance. Sargent, however, noted that production-wise, it contains an "ethereal lusciousness" that hints at "new paths for her to travel".

Retrospectively, critics have considered "Delicate" one of Swift's strongest songs. Paste Jane Song, NME Hannah Mylrae, and Rolling Stone Rob Sheffield all lauded the song's depiction of vulnerability in terms of both lyrics and music, specifically through the vocoder effects. Sheffield ranked it first on his list of the best songs of 2017: "At heart, 'Delicate' is a story about a girl in her room, hearing an electro-beat that lures her to go seek some scandalous adventures in the city lights. In other words, the story of pop music." He ranked "Delicate" fourth on his 2021 ranking of all the 199 songs in Swift's discography. The song featured on 2018 year-end lists by Slant Magazine (9th), Rolling Stone (12th), and Billboard (35th). "Delicate" was one of the award-winning songs at the BMI Pop Awards (2019), and the ASCAP Awards (2019 and 2020).

Commercial performance
"Delicate" was a sleeper hit in the US. Upon its single release in March 2018, it entered at number 84 on the Billboard Hot 100 and number 32 on the Billboard Mainstream Top 40 (Pop Songs) chart. By May, the single entered the top 40 of the Hot 100, fueled by gains in airplay, giving Swift her 56th top-40 entry. In doing so, it extended Swift's record as the woman with the most Hot 100 top-40 entries. In its sixteenth charting week by July, "Delicate" rose to the Hot 100's top 20, driven primarily by strong airplay. It was the second single from Reputation to enter the top 10 of Billboard Radio Songs chart (peaking at number two), after lead single "Look What You Made Me Do". A radio-driven hit, "Delicate" peaked atop the Mainstream Top 40 (Pop Songs) chart, and was Reputation first number-one single on the Billboard Adult Top 40 (Adult Pop Songs) and Adult Contemporary charts. It became the biggest radio hit from Reputation.

Overall, "Delicate" peaked at number 12 on the Billboard Hot 100, spending a total of 35 weeks on the chart, becoming the longest-charting single from Reputation. The single was one of the 10 most successful songs on US airplay of 2018, culminating 2.509 billion radio audience impressions. It was certified double platinum by the Recording Industry Association of America (RIAA), which denotes two million units consisted of sales and on-demand streaming. Philip Cosores from Uproxx claimed that the single was Reputation biggest hit, surpassing the Hot 100 number one "Look What You Made Me Do", which "found a place in cultural ubiquity, but ... felt more like an obligation than an outright choice". Writing for Billboard, Andrew Unterberger described the US chart success of "Delicate" as a "turnaround in momentum" for Swift during the Reputation era. While the preceding singles did not chart more than 20 weeks, "Delicate" continued to grow, especially in airplay, and got "bigger the longer audiences have spent with it". Unterberger attributed the single's success to its vulnerable sentiment and production, a departure from the "outwardly vindictive" sentiments of its preceding singles, which proved that "[the audience] too still like Taylor for Taylor".

"Delicate" peaked within the top 20 on singles charts of Iceland (3), Honduras (11), Malaysia (14), the Czech Republic (19), and Canada (20). It was a top-40 chart entry in Greece, Hungary, Ireland, New Zealand, Norway (where it was certified gold), and Australia (where it was certified platinum). The single was certified platinum in Brazil and Portugal, and gold in the UK, where it charted outside the top 40.

Live performances and covers

Swift included "Delicate" on the set list of her Reputation Stadium Tour (2018). During the concerts, she performed the song while standing in a golden balloon basket that floated above across the crowd. Swift performed an acoustic version of the song on a guitar at BBC Radio 1's Biggest Weekend on May 27, 2018 in Swansea. On December 6, 2018, Swift made an unannounced appearance at the Ally Coalition Talent Show, a benefit concert organized by producer Jack Antonoff in New York, where she performed an acoustic rendition of "Delicate" with Hayley Kiyoko.

On April 23, 2019, Swift performed an acoustic version of the song at the Lincoln Center for the Performing Arts during the Time 100 Gala, where she was honored as one of the "100 most influential people" of the year. During promotion of her seventh studio album Lover in 2019, Swift performed the song at the Wango Tango festival on June 1, at the Amazon Prime Day concert on July 10, and at the City of Lover one-off concert in Paris on September 9. Swift included "Delicate" on the set list of the Eras Tour (2023).

On May 23, 2018, British singer-songwriter James Bay covered "Delicate" as part of his BBC Radio 1's Live Lounge. American singer Kelly Clarkson performed the song in her daytime talk show, The Kelly Clarkson Show.

Credits and personnel
Credits are adapted from the liner notes of Reputation.
 Taylor Swift – vocals, songwriter
 Max Martin – producer, songwriter, programming, keyboards
 Shellback – producer, songwriter, programming, keyboards
 Sam Holland – engineer
 Michael Ilbert – engineer
 Cory Bice – assistant engineer
 Jeremy Lertola – assistant engineer
 Şerban Ghenea – mixing
 John Hanes – mix engineer
 Randy Merrill – mastering

Charts

Weekly charts

Year-end charts

Certifications

Release history

See also
 List of Billboard Adult Top 40 number-one songs of the 2010s
 List of Billboard Adult Contemporary number-one songs of 2018
 List of Billboard Mainstream Top 40 number-one songs of 2018
 Billboard Year-End Hot 100 singles of 2018

Footnotes

References

External links
 
 

2018 singles
2017 songs
2010s ballads
Taylor Swift songs
Song recordings produced by Max Martin
Song recordings produced by Shellback (record producer)
Songs written by Max Martin
Songs written by Shellback (record producer)
Songs written by Taylor Swift
Music videos directed by Joseph Kahn
Big Machine Records singles
Electropop ballads
Vertically-oriented music videos